The 2014 United States House of Representatives election in Wyoming was held on Tuesday, November 4, 2014 to elect the U.S. representative from Wyoming's at-large congressional district, who will represent the state of Wyoming in the 114th United States Congress. The election coincided  with the elections of a U.S. Senator from Wyoming, the Governor of Wyoming and other federal and state offices.

Republican primary

Candidates

Declared
 Cynthia Lummis, incumbent U.S. Representative
 Jason Adam Senteney, corrections officer at the Wyoming Medium Correctional Institution

Results

Democratic primary

Candidates

Declared
 Richard Grayson, attorney, college professor, fiction writer and perennial candidate from Arizona

Results

Third parties

Constitution Party

Declared
 Daniel Clyde Cummings, physician and nominee for the seat in 2012

Libertarian Party

Declared
 Richard Brubaker, truck driver, nominee for the seat in 2012 and nominee for the State House in 2006, 2008 and 2010

General election

Results

See also

 2014 United States House of Representatives elections
 2014 United States elections

References

External links
U.S. House elections in Wyoming, 2014 at Ballotpedia
Campaign contributions at OpenSecrets

Wyoming
2014
United States House